Ayroor (also spelled Ayiroor) is a village Near Thiruvalla,located in the western part of Ranni taluk, in the Pathanamthitta district in Kerala state, India. It is bordered by hills and located near the Western Ghats. Ayroor was previously part of Thiruvalla taluk in Alleppey district and is considered part of the Edanadu region in Kerala. The Pamba River flows on the southern side of the village.

Tourism
The Pamba River and the surrounding hills make Ayiroor a picturesque location in central Travancore.  Residents of Ayiroor cultivate coconut, rubber, cocoa, tapioca, plantains, cinnamon, pepper, nutmeg, vanilla, rambutan and other crops, making the per capita income of the residents higher than the state average. The nearest airports are the Cochin International Airport, located 127 kilometers away, and Trivandrum International Airport, 120 kilometers away.

One of the highlights of Ayroor is the Cherukolpuzha Hindu Parishad, a religious festival that is held for a week in February. Every year since 1912 the festival is held on the dry bed of the Pamba river. Snake boat races also attract people to the village.

Religion
Hinduism and Christianity are the only religions in the region, with a similar number of followers. 
 
Ayroor village used to be a part of the Erstwhile Travancore kingdom. It is believed that the Kovilans ruled Ayroor in the past.

Notable people
 K. Surendranatha Thilakan
 Most Rev Dr. Juhanon Mar Thoma Metropolitan
 Rt. Rev. Dr. Mathews Mar Athanasius Episcopa
 T. K. A. Nair

Main attractions
 Ayroor Chathayam Boat Race
 Cherukolpuzha Hindu Matha Maha Mandalam (Convention)

See also
 Pathanamthitta
 Thiruvalla
 Ranni

References

Villages in Pathanamthitta district